Al Abraq International Airport or Al Bayda International Airport is an airport serving the eastern Libyan city of Bayda. The airport is also known as El Beida International Airport or Airport International El Beida la Abraq.

The Labraq non-directional beacon (Ident: LAB) is located on the field.

Airlines and destinations

See also
Transport in Libya
List of airports in Libya

References

External links
OpenStreetMap - Al Abraq

Airports in Libya
Bayda, Libya
Cyrenaica